Acrolepia is a genus of  moths in the family Acrolepiidae.

Species
The following species are classified:
Acrolepia afghanistanella
Acrolepia aiea
Acrolepia aleuritis
Acrolepia asiatica
Acrolepia aureella
Acrolepia aureonigrella
Acrolepia autumnitella
Acrolepia beardsleyi
Acrolepia bythodes
Acrolepia canachopis
Acrolepia cestrella
Acrolepia chalarodesma
Acrolepia chalcolampra
Acrolepia chariphanes
Acrolepia conchitis
Acrolepia corticosa
Acrolepia dioscoreivora
Acrolepia elaphrodes
Acrolepia gelida
Acrolepia halosema
Acrolepia jaspidata
Acrolepia kasyi
Acrolepia maculella
Acrolepia manganeutis
Acrolepia marmaropis
Acrolepia mixotypa
Acrolepia moriuti
Acrolepia niphosperma
Acrolepia nitrodes
Acrolepia nodulata
Acrolepia nothocestri
Acrolepia oxyglypta
Acrolepia peyerhimoffella
Acrolepia poliopis
Acrolepia prasinaula
Acrolepia rejecta
Acrolepia rungsella
Acrolepia seraphica
Acrolepia syrphacopis
Acrolepia tharsalea
Acrolepia xiphias

References

 , 1986: Die typen der orientalischen, australischen und äthiopischen Acrolepiidae (Lepidoptera). Beiträge zur Entomologie 36 (1): 63-68.
 , 1956: Die Arten der Acrolepia granitella Tr.-Gruppe. Ein Beitrag zur Kenntnis der Genitalmorphologie der Acrolepiidae sowie Beschreibung von 6 neuen Arten (Lep., Acrolepiidae). Zeitschrift der Wiener Entomologischen Gesellschaft 41: 129-144. 

Acrolepiidae
Moth genera